The Longos Vales's Monastery is a Monastery in Longos Vales, Monção, Portugal.

History 
The foundation of the monastery is attributed to D. Afonso Henriques in the second half of the 12th century.

The only enduring element of the primitive medieval construction with its clearly Romanesque style is the main chapel, the remainder of the group was subjected to remodelling work when it passed into the hands of the Society of Jesus.

Nowadays, the monastery is private property, with the exception of the church which continues to be part of the parochial headquarters of the parish.

It is classified by IPPAR as a National Monument since 1926.

See also 
 National Monuments of Portugal
 Churches in Portugal

References

External links 

Buildings and structures in Monção
Churches in Viana do Castelo District
National monuments in Viana do Castelo District